Supia may refer to:

 Supía, Caldas, a town in Colombia
 Supiya, a village in Madhya Pradesh, India
 Beedrill, a Pokémon